Raisa is a short film directed and written by Pavel Cuzuioc starring Cristina Flutur.

Synopsis
Moldova. One winter day, Raisa travels into the city hoping to get something that could change her life.

Production notes
Raisa was filmed during five days in January 2015 on locations in Chisinau and surroundings. The script is based on non-fictional stories by Aurelia Zavtoni.  Post-production took place in Vienna, Austria.
The film is starring Cristina Flutur, who won the Palme d'Or for best Actress in the 2012 Cannes Film Festival.

Technical Details
Raisa was filmed in HD at 25 frames per second on Canon C300.  The screening format is DCP, 2K, with an aspect ratio is 1:2.39.

Awards and nominations

References

External links
 
 
  Premium Films

2015 films
2015 drama films
2015 short films
Romanian drama films
Austrian drama films
Romanian short films
Austrian short films
2010s Romanian-language films